NLB Komercijalna banka (full legal name: NLB Komercijalna banka a.d. Beograd) is a bank founded in 1970 with headquarters in Belgrade, Serbia. It is owned by Slovenian NLB Group.

History

The bank was founded on 1 December 1970 in Belgrade, SFR Yugoslavia. On 6 May 1992, it was transformed into joint-stock company, with Government of Serbia being its majority owner. In November 2002, Komercijalna banka established Komercijalna banka Budva, operating in Montenegro. The bank also had a subsidiary in Bosnia and Herzegovina, Komercijalna banka a.d. with headquarters in Banja Luka.

As of December 2014, two of the bank's biggest stakeholders were the Government of Serbia with 42.6% and European Bank for Reconstruction and Development with 25% of shares.

In March 2015, the bank's management announced that Government of Serbia plans to sell its stake in the bank in the second half of 2017. However, the auction was postponed several times. In June 2019, the Government of Serbia increased its stake in ownership by acquiring 6.8% of shares from DEG and Swedfund International for 43.7 million euros. In November 2019, the Government of Serbia acquired 34.58% of shares from EBRD and International Finance Corporation for 217 million euros, increasing its stake in the bank to 83.23% of shares.

On 26 February 2020, the Government of Serbia signed a purchase agreement worth 387.02 million euros with the Slovenian NLB Group for 83.23% of shares in the bank. As of 30 September 2021, NLB Group owns 88.28% of shares in the bank. As of 30 December 2020, through the privatization process, Komercijalna banka became part of NLB (Nova Ljubljanska banka) Group. On 29 April 2022, Komercijalna banka and NLB Banka a.d. were fully integrated, with Komercijalna banka changing its name to NLB Komercijalna banka. In August 2022, NLB Komercijalna banka withdrew from the Belgrade Stock Exchange.

Market and financial data
According to the 2021 audited consolidated annual financial report, the company has 2,745 employees and posted an annual net income of €23.60 million.

See also
 List of banks in Serbia
 National Bank of Serbia

References

External links
 

1970 establishments in Serbia
Banks established in 1970
Banks of Serbia
Companies based in Belgrade
Serbian brands